By the Light of a Star (Spanish:En la luz de una estrella) is a 1941 Argentine musical drama film directed by Enrique Santos Discépolo and starring Hugo del Carril, Ana María Lynch and María Esther Gamas. It is a tango film, an extremely popular genre during the Golden Age of Argentine Cinema.

Synopsis
A successful tango singer struggles to cope with the demands and opportunities of fame.

Cast
 Hugo del Carril as Jorge  
 Ana María Lynch
 María Esther Gamas 
 Zully Moreno 
 Cirilo Etulain 
 Eduardo Sandrini 
 Adolfo Stray 
 Bernardo Perrone 
 Carlos Lagrotta 
 Julio Renato 
 Adolfo Meyer 
 Lina Estevez 
 Sabina Vittone 
 José S. Harold 
 José Ruzzo 
 Casimiro Ros 
 Manuel Alcón 
 Eduardo de Labar

References

Bibliography 
 Rist, Peter H. Historical Dictionary of South American Cinema. Rowman & Littlefield, 2014.

External links 

1941 films
Argentine musical drama films
1940s musical drama films
1940s Spanish-language films
Films directed by Enrique Santos Discépolo
Tango films
Argentine black-and-white films
1941 drama films
1940s Argentine films